In 2018, no world outdoor athletics championships was held. Major events held during the year included the 2018 IAAF World Indoor Championships, 2018 IAAF Continental Cup, 2018 IAAF World Race Walking Team Championships, and 2018 IAAF World Half Marathon Championships.

Major events

World

IAAF World Indoor Championships
IAAF World U20 Championships
IAAF Continental Cup
IAAF Diamond League
Summer Youth Olympics
Athletics World Cup
World Marathon Majors
World Half Marathon Championships
IAAF World Race Walking Cup
WMRA World Mountain Running Championships
World University Cross Country Championships

Regional

African Championships
Asian Indoor Championships
Asian Junior Championships
Asian Race Walking Championships
Asian Games
Central American and Caribbean Games
Central American Championships
Commonwealth Games
European Athletics Championships
2018 European Athletics U18 Championships
European Cross Country Championships
European Throwing Cup
European Cup 10,000m
European Mountain Running Championships
European Team Championships
Ibero-American Championships
Mediterranean U23 Championships
Micronesian Games
NACAC Cross Country Championships
South American Games
South American U23 Championships
South American Cross Country Championships
South Asian Games
South Asian Junior Championships
Oceania Athletics Championships
Oceania Cross Country Championships

World records

Indoor

Outdoor

Awards

Men

Women

Season's bests

Detailed results

World and continental athletics events
 March 2 – 4: 2018 IAAF World Indoor Championships in  Birmingham
  won both the gold and overall medal tallies.
 March 24: 2018 IAAF World Half Marathon Championships in  Valencia
 Individual winners:  Geoffrey Kipsang Kamworor (m) /  Netsanet Gudeta (f)
 Team winners:  (m) /  (f)
 April 7: 2018 World University Cross Country Championships in  St. Gallen
 Individual winners:  El Hocine Zourkane (m) /  Caterina Juliet Granz (f)
 Team winners:  (m) /  (f)
 May 5 & 6: 2018 IAAF World Race Walking Team Championships in  Taicang
 Individual 10 km Walk winners:  ZHANG Yao (m) /  Alegna González (f)
 Team 10 km Walk winners:  (m) /  (f)
 Individual 20 km Walk winners:  Koki Ikeda (m) /  Lupita González (f)
 Team 20 km Walk winners:  (m) /  (f)
 Individual 50 km Walk winners:  Hirooki Arai (m) /  LIANG Rui (f)
 Team 50 km Walk winners:  (m) /  (f)
 July 5 – 8: 2018 European Athletics U18 Championships in  Győr
  won the gold medal tally.  won the overall medal tally.
 July 10 – 15: 2018 IAAF World U20 Championships in  Tampere
  won the gold medal tally.  won the overall medal tally.
 August 7 – 12: 2018 European Athletics Championships in  Berlin
  &  won 7 gold medals each.  won the overall medal tally. 
 September 8 & 9: 2018 IAAF Continental Cup in  Ostrava
 Champions: Team Americas; Second:  Team Europe; Third: Team Asia-Pacific; Fourth: Team Africa

2018 World Marathon Majors
 February 25:  2018 Tokyo Marathon
 Winners:  Dickson Chumba (m) /  Birhane Dibaba (f)
 April 16:  2018 Boston Marathon
 Winners:  Yuki Kawauchi (m) /  Desiree Linden (f)
 April 22:  2018 London Marathon
 Winners:  Eliud Kipchoge (m) /  Vivian Cheruiyot (f)
 September 16:  2018 Berlin Marathon
 Winners:  Eliud Kipchoge (m) (World Record) /  Gladys Cherono Kiprono (f)
 October 7:  2018 Chicago Marathon
 Winners:  Mo Farah (m) /  Brigid Kosgei (f)
 November 4:  2018 New York City Marathon (final)
 Winners:  Lelisa Desisa (m) /  Mary Jepkosgei Keitany (f)

2018 IAAF Diamond League
 May 4: Qatar Athletic Super Grand Prix in  Doha
 1500 m winners:  Taresa Tolosa (m) /  Caster Semenya (f)
 Men's 200 m winner:  Noah Lyles
 Men's 400 m winner:  Steven Gardiner
 Men's 800 m winner:  Emmanuel Korir
 Men's 3000 m Steeplechase winner:  Chala Beyo
 Men's 400 m Hurdles winner:  Abderrahaman Samba
 Men's High Jump winner:  Mutaz Essa Barshim
 Men's Triple Jump winner:  Pedro Pablo Pichardo
 Men's Javelin Throw winner:  Thomas Röhler
 Women's 100 m winner:  Marie-Josée Ta Lou
 Women's 3000 m winner:  Caroline Chepkoech Kipkirui
 Women's 100 m Hurdles winner:  Kendra Harrison
 Women's Pole Vault winner:  Sandi Morris
 Women's Discus Throw winner:  Sandra Perković
 May 12: Shanghai Golden Grand Prix in 
 Men's 100 m winner:  Reece Prescod
 Men's 400 m winner:  Steven Gardiner
 Men's 800 m winner:  Wycliffe Kinyamal
 Men's 1500 m winner:  Timothy Cheruiyot
 Men's 5000 m winner:  Birhanu Balew
 Men's 110 m Hurdles winner:  Omar McLeod
 Men's Pole Vault winner:  Renaud Lavillenie
 Men's Long Jump winner:  Luvo Manyonga
 Women's 200 m winner:  Shaunae Miller-Uibo
 Women's 3000 m Steeplechase winner:  Beatrice Chepkoech
 Women's 100 m Hurdles winner:  Brianna McNeal
 Women's 400 m Hurdles winner:  Dalilah Muhammad
 Women's High Jump winner:  Mariya Lasitskene (Russia)
 Women's Triple Jump winner:  Caterine Ibargüen
 Women's Shot Put winner:  Gong Lijiao
 Women's Javelin Throw winner:  Lü Huihui
 May 25 & 26: Prefontaine Classic in  Eugene, Oregon
 100 m winners:  Ronnie Baker (m) /  Marie-Josée Ta Lou (f)
 800 m winners:  Emmanuel Korir (m) /  Caster Semenya (f)
 Pole Vault winners:  Sam Kendricks (m) /  Jenn Suhr (f)
 Men's 200 m winner:  Noah Lyles
 Men's One Mile winner:  Timothy Cheruiyot
 Men's Two Miles winner:  Selemon Barega
 Men's 3000 m Steeplechase winner:  Benjamin Kigen
 Men's 110 m Hurdles winner:  Omar McLeod
 Men's High Jump winner:  Mutaz Essa Barshim
 Men's Triple Jump winner:  Christian Taylor
 Men's Shot Put winner:  Ryan Crouser
 Men's Javelin Throw winner:  Thomas Röhler
 Women's 400 m winner:  Shaunae Miller-Uibo
 Women's 1500 m winner:  Shelby Houlihan
 Women's 5000 m winner:  Genzebe Dibaba
 Women's 400 m Hurdles winner:  Janieve Russell
 May 31: Golden Gala Pietro Mennea in  Rome
 400 m winners:  Fred Kerley (m) /  Salwa Eid Naser (f)
 3000 m Steeplechase winners:  Conseslus Kipruto (m) /  Hyvin Jepkemoi (f)
 400 m Hurdles winners:  Abderrahaman Samba (m) /  Georganne Moline (f)
 Discus Throw winners:  Fedrick Dacres (m) /  Sandra Perković (f)
 Men's 100 m winner:  Ronnie Baker
 Men's 800 m winner:  Wycliffe Kinyamal
 Men's 1500 m winner:  Timothy Cheruiyot
 Men's Pole Vault winner:  Sam Kendricks
 Men's Long Jump winner:  Luvo Manyonga
 Women's 200 m winner:  Marie-Josée Ta Lou
 Women's 100 m Hurdles winner:  Sharika Nelvis
 Women's High Jump winner:  Mariya Lasitskene (Russia)
 June 7: Bislett Games in  Oslo
 400 m Hurdles winners:  Abderrahman Samba (m) /  Dalilah Muhammad (f)
 Men's 200 m winner:  Ramil Guliyev
 Men's 1500 m winner:  Chris O'Hare
 Men's One Mile winner:  Elijah Manangoi
 Men's 10000 m winner:  Dominic Chemut Kiptarus
 Men's High Jump winner:  Mutaz Essa Barshim
 Men's Shot Put winner:  Tomas Walsh
 Men's Discus Throw winner:  Andrius Gudžius
 Women's 100 m winner:  Murielle Ahouré
 Women's 400 m winner:  Salwa Eid Naser
 Women's 800 m winner:  Caster Semenya
 Women's 3000 m Steeplechase winner:  Hyvin Jepkemoi
 Women's 100 m Hurdles winner:  Danielle Williams
 Women's Pole Vault winner:  Sandi Morris
 Women's Triple Jump winner:  Caterine Ibargüen
 Women's Javelin Throw winner:  Tatsiana Khaladovich
 June 10: Stockholm Bauhaus Athletics in 
 100 m winners:  Hassan Taftian (m) /  Dina Asher-Smith (f)
 200 m winners:  Ramil Guliyev (m) /  Ivet Lalova-Collio (f)
 800 m winners:  Peter Bol (m) /  Shume Chaltu Regasa (f)
 Pole Vault winners:  Armand Duplantis (m) /  Sandi Morris (f)
 Long Jump winners:  Juan Miguel Echevarría (m) /  Lorraine Ugen (f)
 Men's 1000 m winner:  Ferguson Cheruiyot Rotich
 Men's 5000 m winner:  Selemon Barega
 Men's 400 m Hurdles winner:  Abderrahman Samba
 Men's Discus Throw winner:  Fedrick Dacres
 Women's 400 m winner:  Salwa Eid Naser
 Women's 1500 m winner:  Gudaf Tsegay
 Women's 100 m Hurdles winner:  Brianna McNeal
 Women's High Jump winner:  Mariya Lasitskene (Russia)
 June 30: Meeting de Paris in 
 200 m winners:  Michael Norman (m) /  Shericka Jackson (f)
 800 m winners:  Ferguson Cheruiyot Rotich (m) /  Caster Semenya (f)
 Discus Throw winners:  Fedrick Dacres (m) /  Sandra Perković (f)
 Men's 100 m winner:  Ronnie Baker
 Men's 1500 m winner:  Timothy Cheruiyot
 Men's 110 m Hurdles winner:  Ronald Levy
 Men's 400 m Hurdles winner:  Abderrahman Samba
 Men's Pole Vault winner:  Sam Kendricks
 Women's 400 m winner:  Salwa Eid Naser
 Women's 3000 m Steeplechase winner:  Beatrice Chepkoech
 Women's High Jump winner:  Mariya Lasitskene (Russia)
 Women's Triple Jump winner:  Caterine Ibargüen
 July 5: Athletissima in  Lausanne
 200 m winners:  Noah Lyles (m) /  Gabrielle Thomas (f)
 400 m Hurdles winners:  Abderrahman Samba (m) /  Shamier Little (f)
 Pole Vault winners:  Renaud Lavillenie (m) /  Katerina Stefanidi (f)
 Men's 5000 m winner:  Birhanu Balew
 Men's 110 m Hurdles winner:  Sergey Shubenkov (Russia)
 Men's High Jump winner:  Danil Lysenko (Russia)
 Men's Triple Jump winner:  Christian Taylor
 Men's Shot Put winner:  Tomas Walsh
 Women's 100 m winner:  Marie-Josée Ta Lou
 Women's 400 m winner:  Salwa Eid Naser
 Women's 800 m winner:  Francine Niyonsaba
 Women's 1500 m winner:  Shelby Houlihan
 Women's Long Jump winner:  Malaika Mihambo
 Women's Javelin Throw winner:  Nikola Ogrodníková
 July 13: Meeting International Mohammed VI d'Athlétisme de Rabat in 
 Men's 100 m winner:  Christian Coleman
 Men's 400 m winner:  Akeem Bloomfield
 Men's 1500 m winner:  Brahim Kaazouzi
 Men's 3000 m winner:  Yomif Kejelcha
 Men's 3000 m Steeplechase winner:  Benjamin Kigen
 Men's Pole Vault winner:  Sam Kendricks
 Men's Long Jump winner:  Tajay Gayle
 Men's Javelin Throw winner:  Magnus Kirt
 Women's 200 m winner:  Shaunae Miller-Uibo
 Women's 800 m winner:  Francine Niyonsaba
 Women's 1000 m winner:  Caster Semenya
 Women's 5000 m winner:  Hellen Obiri
 Women's 100 m Hurdles winner:  Brianna McNeal
 Women's High Jump winner:  Mirela Demireva
 Women's Triple Jump winner:  Caterine Ibargüen
 Women's Shot Put winner:  Christina Schwanitz
 July 20: Herculis in  Fontvieille, Monaco
 800 m winners:  Nijel Amos (m) /  Caster Semenya (f)
 3000 m Steeplechase winners:  Soufiane El Bakkali (m) /  Beatrice Chepkoech (f)
 Shot Put winners:  Ryan Crouser (m) /  Gong Lijiao (f)
 Men's 200 m winner:  Noah Lyles
 Men's 1500 m winner:  Timothy Cheruiyot
 Men's 110 m Hurdles winner:  Sergey Shubenkov (Russia)
 Men's High Jump winner:  Danil Lysenko (Russia)
 Men's Triple Jump winner:  Christian Taylor
 Women's 100 m winner:  Marie-Josée Ta Lou
 Women's 400 m winner:  Shaunae Miller-Uibo
 Women's 100 m Hurdles winner:  Queen Harrison
 Women's Pole Vault winner:  Anzhelika Sidorova (Russia)
 July 21 & 22: Müller Anniversary Games in  London
 100 m winners:  Ronnie Baker (m) /  Shelly-Ann Fraser-Pryce (f)
 200 m winners:  Akeem Bloomfield (m) /  Jenna Prandini (f)
 400 m winners:  Abdalelah Haroun (m) /  Stephenie Ann McPherson (f)
 800 m winners:  Emmanuel Korir (m) /  Ce'Aira Brown (f)
 400 m Hurdles winners:  Karsten Warholm (m) /  Shamier Little (f)
 Long Jump winners:  Luvo Manyonga (m) /  Shara Proctor (f)
 Men's 1500 m winner:  Matthew Centrowitz Jr.
 Men's 5000 m winner:  Paul Chelimo
 Men's 3000 m Race Walk winner:  Tom Bosworth
 Men's 110 m Hurdles winner:  Ronald Levy
 Men's Pole Vault winner:  Sam Kendricks
 Women's One Mile winner:  Sifan Hassan
 Women's 3000 m winner:  Lilian Kasait Rengeruk
 Women's 100 m Hurdles winner:  Kendra Harrison
 Women's Javelin Throw winner:  Lü Huihui
 Women's High Jump winner:  Mariya Lasitskene (Russia)
 Women's Discus Throw winner:  Sandra Perković
 August 18: Müller Grand Prix Birmingham in 
 Long Jump winners:  Luvo Manyonga (m) /  Malaika Mihambo (f)
 Men's 100 m winner:  Christian Coleman
 Men's 400 m winner:  Fred Kerley
 Men's 800 m winner:  Emmanuel Korir
 Men's One Mile winner:  Stewart McSweyn
 Men's 3000 m Steeplechase winner:  Conseslus Kipruto
 Men's 110 m Hurdles winner:  Orlando Ortega
 Men's High Jump winner:  Brandon Starc
 Men's Javelin Throw winner:  Andreas Hofmann
 Women's 200 m winner:  Shaunae Miller-Uibo
 Women's 1000 m winner:  Laura Muir
 Women's 1500 m winner:  Sifan Hassan
 Women's 3000 m winner:  Agnes Jebet Tirop
 Women's 100 m Hurdles winner:  Pamela Dutkiewicz
 Women's 400 m Hurdles winner:  Léa Sprunger
 Women's Pole Vault winner:  Sandi Morris
 Women's Shot Put winner:  Christina Schwanitz 
 August 29 & 30: Weltklasse Zürich in 
 400 m Hurdles winners:  Kyron McMaster (m) /  Dalilah Muhammad (f)
 Javelin Throw winners:  Andreas Hofmann (m) /  Tatsiana Khaladovich (f)
 Men's 200 m winner:  Noah Lyles
 Men's 400 m winner:  Fred Kerley
 Men's 1500 m winner:  Timothy Cheruiyot
 Men's 3000 m Steeplechase winner:  Conseslus Kipruto
 Men's Pole Vault winner:  Timur Morgunov (Russia)
 Men's Long Jump winner:  Luvo Manyonga
 Men's Shot Put winner:  Tomas Walsh
 Women's 100 m winner:  Murielle Ahouré
 Women's 800 m winner:  Caster Semenya
 Women's 5000 m winner:  Hellen Obiri
 Women's High Jump winner:  Mariya Lasitskene (Russia)
 Women's Pole Vault winner:  Katerina Stefanidi
 Women's Triple Jump winner:  Caterine Ibargüen
 August 31: Memorial Van Damme (final) in  Brussels
 400 m winners:  Jonathan Sacoor (m) /  Salwa Eid Naser (f)
 800 m winners:  Emmanuel Korir (m) /  Lynsey Sharp (f)
 High Jump winners:  Brandon Starc (m) /  Nafissatou Thiam (f)
 Discus Throw winners:  Fedrick Dacres (m) /  Yaime Pérez (f)
 Men's 100 m winner:  Christian Coleman
 Men's 5000 m winner:  Selemon Barega
 Men's 110 m Hurdles winner:  Sergey Shubenkov (Russia)
 Men's Pole Vault winner:  Timur Morgunov (Russia)
 Men's Triple Jump winner:  Pedro Pablo Pichardo
 Women's 200 m winner:  Shaunae Miller-Uibo
 Women's 1500 m winner:  Laura Muir
 Women's 3000 m Steeplechase winner:  Beatrice Chepkoech
 Women's 100 m Hurdles winner:  Brianna McNeal
 Women's 400 m Hurdles winner:  Hanna Ryzhykova
 Women's Shot Put winner:  Gong Lijiao
 Women's Long Jump winner:  Caterine Ibargüen

2018 IAAF World Challenge & IAAF Hammer Throw Challenge
 May 19: Jamaica International Invitational in  Kingston
 100 m winners:  Ronnie Baker (m) /  Elaine Thompson (f)
 200 m winners:  Christopher Taylor (m) /  Shericka Jackson (f)
 400 m winners:  Demish Gaye (m) /  Jessica Beard (f)
 400 m Hurdles winners:  TJ Holmes (m) /  Janieve Russell (f)
 Men's 800 m winner:  Ryan Sánchez
 Men's 3000 m winner:  Alfredo Santana
 Men's High Jump winner:  Jamal Wilson
 Men's Triple Jump winner:  Omar Craddock
 Women's 1500 m winner:  Stephanie Brown
 Women's 100 m Hurdles winner:  Jasmin Stowers
 Women's Long Jump winner:  Ese Brume
 Women's Shot Put winner:  Jeneva Stevens
 Women's Hammer Throw winner:  DeAnna Price
 May 20: Golden Grand Prix in  Osaka
 100 m winners:  Justin Gatlin (m) /  Wei Yongli (f)
 800 m winners:  Mostafa Smaili (m) /  Emily Cherotich Tuei (f)
 400 m Hurdles winners:  Takatoshi Abe (m) /  Sage Watson (f)
 Pole Vault winners:  Scott Houston (m) /  Kristen Hixson (f)
 Javelin Throw winners:  Cheng Chao-tsun (m) /  Liu Shiying (f)
 Men's 200 m winner:  Isaac Makwala
 Men's 1500 m winner:  Ryan Gregson
 Men's 110 m Hurdles winner:  Chen Kuei-ru
 Men's High Jump winner:  Naoto Tobe
 Men's Long Jump winner:  Jarvis Gotch
 Men's Shot Put winner:  Damien Birkinhead
 Men's Hammer Throw winner:  Paweł Fajdek
 Women's 400 m winner:  Justyna Święty-Ersetic
 Women's 3000 m winner:  Shuru Bulo
 Women's 100 m Hurdles winner:  Queen Harrison
 June 3: Fanny Blankers-Koen Games in  Hengelo (World Challenge only)
 200 m winners:  Luxolo Adams (m) /  Dafne Schippers (f)
 400 m winners:  Abdalelah Haroun (m) /  Shakima Wimbley (f)
 Men's 800 m winner:  Jonathan Kitilit
 Men's 110 m Hurdles winner:  Sergey Shubenkov (Russia)
 Men's Pole Vault winner:  Sam Kendricks
 Men's Long Jump winner:  Luvo Manyonga
 Women's One Mile winner:  Jenny Simpson
 Women's 100 m Hurdles winner:  Brianna McNeal
 Women's High Jump winner:  Mariya Lasitskene (Russia)
 June 5: Paavo Nurmi Games in  Turku
 200 m winners:  Ramil Guliyev (m) /  Finette Agyapong (f)
 400 m Hurdles winners:  Mamadou Kassé Hanne (m) /  Meghan Beesley (f)
 Men's 1500 m winner:  Younès Essalhi
 Men's 3000 m Steeplechase winner:  Nicholas Kiptonui Bett
 Men's 110 m Hurdles winner:  Sergey Shubenkov (Russia)
 Men's High Jump winner:  Maksim Nedasekau
 Men's Hammer Throw winner:  Wojciech Nowicki
 Men's Javelin Throw winner:  Magnus Kirt
 Women's 3000 m winner:  Meskerem Mamo
 Women's 100 m Hurdles winner:  Ebony Morrison
 Women's Pole Vault winner:  Nikoleta Kyriakopoulou
 Women's Triple Jump winner:  Tori Franklin
 Women's Discus Throw winner:  Sandra Perković
 June 13: 57th Golden Spike Ostrava in  Ostrava
 200 m winners:  Aaron Brown (m) /  Dafne Schippers (f)
 Men's 100 m winner:  Justin Gatlin
 Men's 400 m winner:  Abdalelah Haroun
 Men's 3000 m winner:  Selemon Barega
 Men's 110 m Hurdles winner:  Pascal Martinot-Lagarde
 Men's Discus Throw winner:  Andrius Gudžius
 Men's High Jump winner:  Mutaz Essa Barshim
 Men's Pole Vault winner:  Paweł Wojciechowski
 Men's Long Jump winner:  Juan Miguel Echevarría
 Men's Shot Put winner:  Tomas Walsh
 Men's Javelin Throw winner:  Jakub Vadlejch
 Women's 800 m winner:  Rababe Arafi
 Women's 1500 m winner:  Gudaf Tsegay
 Women's 3000 m Steeplechase winner:  Norah Jeruto
 Women's Hammer Throw winner:  Anita Włodarczyk
 June 22: Meeting de Atletismo Madrid in  Madrid (World Challenge only)
 800 m winners:  Álvaro de Arriba (m) /  Christina Hering (f)
 Men's 100 m winner:  Su Bingtian
 Men's 400 m winner:  Luguelín Santos
 Men's 3000 m Steeplechase winner:  Albert Chemutai
 Men's 110 m Hurdles winner:  Gabriel Constantino
 Men's High Jump winner:  Danil Lysenko (Russia)
 Men's Pole Vault winner:  Diogo Ferreira
 Men's Triple Jump winner:  Alexis Copello
 Men's Javelin Throw winner:  Marcin Krukowski
 Women's 200 m winner:  Ángela Tenorio
 Women's 1500 m winner:  Gudaf Tsegay
 Women's 100 m Hurdles winner:  Eline Berings
 Women's Long Jump winner:  Shara Proctor
 Women's Shot Put winner:  Christina Schwanitz
 Women's Hammer Throw winner:  Anita Włodarczyk
 June 29: P-T-S Meeting in  Šamorín (Hammer Throw Challenge only)
 Men's Hammer Throw winner:  Wojciech Nowicki
 July 1 & 2: István Gyulai Memorial in  Székesfehérvár (Hammer Throw Challenge only)
 Winners:  Wojciech Nowicki (m) /  Anita Włodarczyk (f)
 July 8: Grande Premio Brasil Caixa de Atletismo in  Bragança Paulista (World Challenge only)
 100 m winners:  Paulo André Camilo de Oliveira (m) /  Vitória Cristina Rosa (f)
 3000 m Steeplechase winners:  Nicholas Kiptonui Bett (m) /  Birtukan Adamu (f)
 Triple Jump winners:  Chris Carter (m) /  Liadagmis Povea (f)
 Shot Put winners:  Curt Jensen (m) /  Yaniuvis López (f)
 Discus Throw winners:  Apostolos Parellis (m) /  Andressa de Morais (f)
 Men's 400 m winner:  Bralon Taplin
 Men's 400 m Hurdles winner:  Márcio Teles
 Men's Pole Vault winner:  Cole Walsh
 Men's Hammer Throw winner:  Dilshod Nazarov
 Women's 100 m Hurdles winner:  Ebony Morrison
 Women's High Jump winner:  Levern Spencer
 August 22: Kamila Skolimowska Memorial in  Chorzów (Hammer Throw Challenge only)
 Women's Hammer Throw winner:  Joanna Fiodorow
 100 m winners:  Tyquendo Tracey (m) /  Marie-Josée Ta Lou (f)
 Javelin Throw winners:  Thomas Röhler (m) /  Kelsey-Lee Roberts (f)
 Men's 1500 m winner:  Timothy Cheruiyot
 Men's 110 m Hurdles winner:  Orlando Ortega
 Men's High Jump winner:  Maksim Nedasekau
 Men's Discus Throw winner:  Christoph Harting
 Women's 1000 m winner:  Caster Semenya
 Women's One Mile winner:  Marta Pen
 Women's 3000 m Steeplechase winner:  Colleen Quigley
 Women's 100 m Hurdles winner:  Christina Manning
 Women's Long Jump winner:  Brooke Stratton
 Women's Triple Jump winner:  Kimberly Williams
 Women's Shot Put winner:  Christina Schwanitz
 100 m winners:  Mike Rodgers (m) /  Marie-Josée Ta Lou (f)
 400 m winners:  Luka Janežič (m) /  Salwa Eid Naser (f)
 Discus Throw winners:  Fedrick Dacres (m) /  Sandra Perković (f)
 Men's 200 m winner:  Alonso Edward
 Men's 800 m winner:  Nijel Amos
 Men's 1500 m winner:  Elijah Manangoi
 Men's 110 m Hurdles winner:  Orlando Ortega 
 Men's Shot Put winner:  Ryan Crouser
 Men's Pole Vault winner:  Timur Morgunov (Russia)
 Men's Long Jump winner:  Luvo Manyonga
 Women's 3000 m winner:  Lilian Kasait Rengeruk
 Women's 100 m Hurdles winner:  Sharika Nelvis
 Women's 400 m Hurdles winner:  Hanna Ryzhykova
 Women's Triple Jump winner:  Elena Panțuroiu

2018 IAAF World Indoor Tour
 February 3: Weltklasse in Karlsruhe in 
 60 m winners:  Su Bingtian (m) /  Tatjana Pinto (f)
 Women's 60 m Hurdles winner:  Sharika Nelvis
 Women's 400 m winner:  Léa Sprunger
 Men's 800 m winner:  Marcin Lewandowski 
 Women's 1500 m winner:   Genzebe Dibaba
 Men's 3000 m winner:  Hagos Gebrhiwet
 Women's High Jump winner:  Mirela Demireva
 Men's Pole Vault winner:  Raphael Holzdeppe
 Long Jump winners:  Juan Miguel Echevarría (m) /  Malaika Mihambo (f)
 February 6: PSD Bank Meeting in  Düsseldorf
 60 m winners:  Su Bingtian (m) /  Asha Philip (f)
 60 m Hurdles winners:  Balázs Baji (m) /  Christina Manning (f)
 1500 m winners:  Vincent Kibet
 Men's 800 m winner:  Adam Kszczot
 Women's 1500 m winner:  Beatrice Chepkoech
 Men's 3000 m winner:  Yomif Kejelcha
 Men's Pole Vault winner:  Piotr Lisek
 Men's Shot Put winner:  Tomáš Staněk
 Women's Long Jump winner:  Ivana Španović
 February 8: Madrid Indoor Meeting in 
 400 m winners:  Óscar Husillos (m) /  Léa Sprunger (f)
 800 m winners:  Adam Kszczot (m) /  Esther Guerrero Puigdevall (f)
 1500 m winners:  Ayanleh Souleiman (m) /  Genzebe Dibaba (f)
 Triple Jump winners:  Almir dos Santos (m) /  Viktoriya Prokopenko (f)
 Men's 60 m winner:  Mike Rodgers
 Men's Pole Vault winner:  Konstantinos Filippidis
 Men's Shot Put winner:  Tomáš Staněk
 Women's 3000 m winner:  Meraf Bahta
 Women's High Jump winner:  Mariya Lasitskene
 February 10: New Balance Indoor Grand Prix in  Boston
 400 m winners:  Deon Lendore (m) /  Shakima Wimbley (f)
 800 m winners:  Donavan Brazier (m) /  Jenna Westaway (f)
 1500 m winners:  Chris O'Hare (m) /  Dawit Seyaum (f)
 3000 m winners:  Edward Cheserek (m) /  Jennifer Simpson (f)
 Men's 60 m winner:  Christian Coleman
 Men's 300 m winner:  Jereem Richards
 Men's Triple Jump winner:  Chris Carter
 Women's 60 m Hurdles winner:  Sharika Nelvis
 Women's High Jump winner:  Erika Kinsey
 February 15: Copernicus Cup in  Toruń
 60 m winners:  Ján Volko (m) /  Marie-Josée Ta Lou
 400 m winners:  Luka Janežič (m) /  Iveta Putalová
 800 m winners:  Adam Kszczot (m) / } Angelika Cichocka
 1500 m winners:  Taresa Tolosa (m) /  Rababe Arafi
 60 m Hurdles winners:  Milan Trajkovic (m) /  Pamela Dutkiewicz
 Men's Pole Vault winner:  Piotr Lisek
 Men's Triple Jump winner:  Cristian Nápoles
 Men's Shot Put winner:  Konrad Bukowiecki
 Women's High Jump winner:  Mariya Lasitskene
 February 25: Müller Indoor Grand Prix (final) in  Glasgow
 60 m winners:  Su Bingtian (m) /  Marie-Josée Ta Lou (f)
 400 m winners:  Fred Kerley (m) /  Phyllis Francis (f)
 800 m winners:  Adam Kszczot (m) /  Līga Velvere (f)
 1500 m winners:  Bethwell Birgen (m) /  Beatrice Chepkoech (f)
 60 m Hurdles winners:  Ronald Levy (m) /  Christina Manning (f)
 Long Jump winners:  Shi Yuhao (m) /  Khaddi Sagnia (f)
 Men's 3000 m winner:  Justus Soget Kiplagat
 Men's 3000 m Race Walk winner:  Tom Bosworth
 Women's High Jump winner:  Mariya Lasitskene
 Women's Pole Vault winner:  Katerina Stefanidi

2018 IAAF Combined Events Challenge
 April 27 & 28: Multistars in  Florence
 Decathlon winner:  Martin Roe (8,228 points)
 Heptathlon winner:  Erica Bougard (6,327 points)
 May 26 & 27: Hypo-Meeting in  Götzis
 Decathlon winner:  Damian Warner (8,795 points)
 Heptathlon winner:  Nafissatou Thiam (6,806 points)
 June 9 & 10: Oceania Combined Events Championships in  Townsville
 June 16 & 17: Mehrkampf-Meeting Ratingen in 
 Decathlon winner:  Arthur Abele (8,481 points)
 Heptathlon winner:  Carolin Schäfer (6,549 points)
 June 21 – 24: Part of the 2018 USA Outdoor Track and Field Championships in  Des Moines
 Decathlon winner:  Zach Ziemek (8,294 points)
 Heptathlon winner:  Erica Bougard (6,347 points)
 July 3 & 4: 2018 Pan American Combined Events Cup in  Ottawa
 Decathlon winner:  Scott Filip (7,643 points)
 Heptathlon winner:  Georgia Ellenwood (6,026 points)
 August 7 – 12: Part of the 2018 European Athletics Championships in  Berlin
 Decathlon winner:  Arthur Abele (8,431 points)
 Heptathlon winner:  Nafissatou Thiam (6,816 points)
 September 15 & 16: Décastar (final) in  Talence
 Decathlon winner:  Kevin Mayer (9,126 points) (World Record)
 Heptathlon winner:  Carolin Schäfer (6,457 points)

2018 IAAF Cross Country Permit
 November 12, 2017: Cross de Atapuerca in  Burgos
 Winners:  Getaneh Molla (m) /  Senbere Teferi (f)
 January 6: Campaccio in  San Giorgio su Legnano
 Winners:  James Kibet (m) /  Lilian Rengeruk (f)
 January 6: Antrim International Cross Country in 
 Winners:  Timothy Cheruiyot (m) /  Margaret Chelimo Kipkemboi (f)
 January 14: Cross Internacional Juan Muguerza in  Elgoibar
 Winners:  Selemon Barega /  Ruth Jebet (f)
 January 21: Cross Internacional de Itálica in  Seville
 Winners:  Joshua Cheptegei (m) /  Agnes Jebet Tirop (f)
 February 11: Cinque Mulini in  San Vittore Olona
 Winners:  Jacob Kiplimo (m) /  Letesenbet Gidey (f)
 February 18: Almond Blossom Cross Country (final) in  Albufeira
 Winners:  Soufianne El Bakkali (m) /  Salomé Rocha (f)

2018 IAAF Race Walking Challenge
 February 11: 2018 Oceania Race Walking Championships in  Adelaide
 20 km Walk winners:  Perseus Karlström (m) /  Beki Smith (f)
 February 24 & 25: Memorial Jerzy Hausleber in  Monterrey
 20 km Walk winners:  Lebogang Shange (m) /  Lupita González (f)
 50 km Walk winners:  Andrés Chocho (m) /  Erika Jazmine Morales (f)
 March 10: 2018 South American Race Walking Championships in  Sucúa
 20 km Walk winners:  Andrés Chocho (m) /  Érica de Sena (f)
 50 km Walk winners:  James Rendón (m) /  Magaly Bonilla (f)
 April 7: Grande Prémio Internacional de Rio Maior em Marcha Atlética in 
 20 km Walk winners:  Diego García (m) /  Qieyang Shenjie (f)
 June 2: Gran Premio Cantones de La Coruña in 
 20 km Walk winners:  Éider Arévalo (m) /  Qieyang Shenjie (f)
 September 23 – 26: Around Taihu International Race Walking 2018 in  Suzhou
 20 km Walk winners:  Éider Arévalo (m) /  Wang Yingliu (f)

2018 IAAF Road Race Label Events (Gold)
 January 7: Xiamen International Marathon in 
 Winners:  Dejene Debela (m) /  Fatuma Sado (f)
 January 14: Houston Half Marathon in the 
 Winners:  Jake Robertson (m) /  Ruti Aga (f)
 January 21: Hong Kong Marathon in 
 Winners:  Kenneth Mburu Mungara (m) /  Gulume Tollesa (f)
 January 26: Dubai Marathon in the 
 Winners:  Mosinet Geremew (m) /  Roza Dereje (f)
 Winner:  Mizuki Matsuda
 February 11: eDreams Mitja Marató de Barcelona in 
 Winners:  Mule Wasihun (m) /  Tejitu Daba (f)
 February 25: Seville Marathon in 
 Winners:  Dickson Tuwei Kipsang (m) /  Koutar Boulaid (f)
 Winner:  Joseph Macharia Ndirangu
 March 11: Roma-Ostia Half Marathon in 
 Winners:  Galen Rupp (m) /  Haftamenesh Tesfay Haylu (f)
 Winner:  Meskerem Assefa
 March 11: Lisbon Half Marathon in 
 Winners:  Erick Kiptanui (m) /  Etagegn Woldu (f)
 March 18: Seoul International Marathon in 
 Winners:  Wilson Loyanae (m) /  Damte Hiru (f)
 March 25: Chongqing International Marathon in 
 Winners:  Kennedy Cheboror (m) /  Meseret Legese (f)
 April 7: Prague Half Marathon in the 
 Winners:  Benard Kimeli (m) /  Joan Melly (f)
 April 8: Paris Marathon in 
 Winners:  Paul Lonyangata (m) /  Betsy Saina (f)
 April 8: Rotterdam Marathon in the 
 Winners:  Kenneth Kipkemoi (m) /  Visiline Jepkesho (f)
 April 8: Istanbul Half Marathon in 
 Winners:  Amdework Walelegn (m) /  Ababel Yeshaneh (f)
 April 22: Vienna City Marathon in 
 Winners:  Salaheddine Bounasser (m) /  Nancy Kiprop (f)
 April 22: Gifu Seiryu Half Marathon in 
 Winners:  Nicholas Kosimbei (m) /  Degitu Azmeraw (f)
 April 22: Yangzhou Jianzhen International Half Marathon in 
 Winners:  Mosinet Geremew (m) /  Ababel Yeshaneh (f)
 April 22: Madrid Marathon in 
 Winners:  Eliud Kiplagat Barngetuny (m) /  Valentine Kipketer (f)
 May 5: Yellow River Estuary International Marathon in 
 Winners:  Joel Kemboi Kimurer (m) /  Letebrhan Haylay (f)
 May 6: Prague Marathon in the 
 Winners:  Galen Rupp (m) /  Bornes Jepkirui Kitur (f)
 May 19: Karlovy Vary Half Marathon in the 
 Winners:  Roman Romanenko (m) /  Eva Vrabcová-Nývltová (f)
 May 26 & 27: Ottawa Race Weekend in 
 Ottawa 10 km winners:  Andamlak Berta (m) /  Alia Saeed Mohammed (f)
 Ottawa Marathon winners:  Yemane Tsegay (m) /  Gelete Burka (f)
 May 27: World 10K Bangalore in 
 Winners:  Geoffrey Kipsang Kamworor (m) /  Agnes Jebet Tirop (f)
 June 2: České Budějovice Half Marathon in 
 Winners:  Luke Traynor (m) /  Lilia Fisikowici (f)
 June 10: Lanzhou International Marathon in 
 Winners:  Kelkile Gezahegn (m) /  Merima Mohammed (f)
 June 23: Olomouc Half Marathon in 
 Winners:  Stephen Kiprop (m) /  Netsanet Gudeta (f)
 July 1: Gold Coast Marathon in 
 Winners:  Kenneth Mburu Mungara (m) /  Ruth Chebitok (f)
 July 29: Bogotá Half Marathon in 
 Winners:  Betesfa Getahun (m) /  Netsanet Gudeta (f)
 September 8: Prague Grand Prix in 
 Winners:  Rhonex Kipruto (m) /  Caroline Chepkoech Kipkirui (f)
 September 15: Ústí nad Labem Half Marathon in 
 Winners:  Stephen Kiprop (m) /  Diana Chemtai Kipyokei (f)
 September 16: Copenhagen Half Marathon in 
 Winners:  Daniel Kipchumba (m) /  Sifan Hassan (f)
 September 16: Sydney Marathon in 
 Winners:  Elijah Kemboi (m) /  Mercy Kibarus (f)
 September 16: Beijing Marathon in 
 Winners:  Dejene Debela (m) /  Valary Jemeli Aiyabei (f)
 September 23: Cape Town Marathon in 
 Winners:  Stephen Mokoka (m) /  Helalia Johannes (f)
 October 14: Portugal Half Marathon in 
 Winners:  Mustapha El Aziz (m) /  Yebrgual Melese Arage (f)
 October 21: Amsterdam Marathon in 
 Winners:  Lawrence Cherono (m) /  Tadelech Bekele (f)
 October 21: Delhi Half Marathon in 
 Winners:  Andamlak Belihu (m) /  Tsehay Gemechu (f)
 October 21: Toronto Waterfront Marathon in 
 Winners:  Benson Kipruto (m) /  Mimi Belete (f)
 October 28: Frankfurt Marathon in 
 Winners:  Kelkile Gezahegn (m) /  Meskerem Assefa (f)
 October 28: Valencia Half Marathon in 
 Winners:  Abraham Kiptum (m) /  Gelete Burka (f)
 November 11: Istanbul Marathon in 
 Winners:  Felix Kimutai (m) /  Ruth Chepngetich (f)
 November 18: Shanghai Marathon in 
 Winners:  Abdiwak Tura (m) /  Yebrgual Melese (f)
 Winner:  Yuma Hattori
 December 2: Valencia Marathon in 
 Winners:  Leul Gebrselassie (m) /  Ashete Dido (f)
 December 9: Guangzhou Marathon in 
 Winners:  Mohammed Ziani (m) /  Tigist Girma (f)
 December 9: Singapore Marathon in 
 Winners:  Joshua Kipkorir (m) /  Priscah Jepleting Cherono (f)

2018 IAAF Road Race Label Events (Silver)
 January 14: Houston Marathon in the 
 Winners:  Bazu Worku (m) /  Biruktayit Degefa (f)
 January 21: Mumbai Marathon in 
 Winners:  Solomon Deksisa (m) /  Amane Gobena (f)
 February 4: Kagawa Marugame Half Marathon in 
 Winners:  Edward Waweru (m) /  Betsy Saina (f)
 March 18: New Taipei City Wan Jin Shi Marathon in 
 Winners:  Yuki Kawauchi (m) /  Nguriatukei Rael Kiyara (f)
 April 1: Daegu Marathon in 
 Winners:  Abraham Kiptum (m) /  Janet Rono (f)
 April 8: Hannover Marathon in 
 Winners:  Seboka Negussa (m) /  Agnes Kiprop (f)
 April 8: Milano City Marathon in 
 Winners:  Seyefu Tura (m) /  Lucy Wangui Kabuu (f)
 April 8: Rome Marathon in 
 Winners:  Cosmas Kipchoge Birech (m) /  Rahma Tusa (f)
 April 22: Orlen Warsaw Marathon in 
 Winners:  Ezekiel Omullo (m) /  Nastassia Ivanova (f)
 May 12: Okpekpe Intn'l 10 km Road Race in 
 Winners:  Alex Kibet (m) /  Dera Dida (f)
 August 26: Mexico City Marathon in 
 Winners:  Titus Ekiru (m) /  Etaferahu Temesgen (f)
 September 8: Taiyuan International Marathon in 
 Winners:  Ezekial Kemboi Omullo (m) /  Alice Jepkemboi Kimutai (f)
 September 23: Dam tot Damloop in 
 Winners:  Joshua Cheptegei (m) /  Lonah Chemtai Salpeter (f)
 September 29: Hengshui Lake International Marathon in 
 Winners:  Lemi Berhanu Hayle (m) /  Waganesh Mekasha (f)
 October 7: Cardiff Half Marathon in 
 Winners:  Jack Raynor (m) /  Juliet Chekwel (f)
 October 7: Košice Peace Marathon in 
 Winners:  Raymond Choge (m) /  Milliam Ebongon (f)
 October 14: Lisbon Marathon in 
 Winners:  Limenih Getachew (m) /  Kuftu Dadiso Tahir (f)
 October 14: 20 Kilomètres de Paris in 
 Winners:  Samuel Tsegay (m) /  Ophélie Claude-Boxberger (f)
 October 28: Ljubljana Marathon in 
 Winners:  Sisay Lemma (m) /  Visiline Jepkesho (f)
 October 28: Marseille-Cassis Classique Internationale in 
 Winners:  Olika Adugna (m) /  Gete Alemayehu (f)
 November 4: Hangzhou International Marathon in 
 Winners:  Michael Njenga Kunyuga (m) /  Hirut Tibedu (f)
 November 11: Beirut Marathon in 
 Winners:  Mohamed Reda El Aaraby (m) /  Medina Deme Armino (f)
 Winner:  Dalila Abdulkadir
 December 16: Shenzhen Marathon in 
 Winners:  Edwin Kipngetich Koech (m) /  Mulu Seboka (f)
 December 30: Corrida de Houilles in 
 Winners:  Julien Wanders (m) /  Gete Alemayehu (f)
 December 31: San Silvestre Vallecana in 
 Winners:  Jacob Kiplimo (m) /  Brigid Kosgei (f)

2018 IAAF Road Race Label Events (Bronze)
 February 10: Lagos Marathon in 
 Winners:  Abraham Kiprotich (m) /  Almenesh Herpha (f)
 February 18: Medio Maratón Internacional Electrolit Guadalajara in 
 Winners:  John Nzau Mwangangi (m) /  Diana Chemtai Kipyokei (f)
 March 11: Barcelona Marathon in 
 Winners:  Anthony Maritim (m) /  Ruth Chebitok (f)
 March 18: ONICO Gdynia Half Marathon in 
 Winners:  Ben Somikwo (m) /  Christine Oigo (f)
 March 25: PZU Pólmaraton Warszawski in 
 Winners:  Ezrah Sang (m) /  Pauline Njeru (f)
 April 8: Pyongyang Marathon in 
 Winners:  RI Kang-pom (m) /  Kim Hye-song (f)
 April 15: Nagano Olympic Commemorative Marathon in 
 Winners:  Abdela Godana (m) /  Asami Furuse (f)
 April 15: DOZ Marathon Łódz in 
 Winners:  Tarekegn Zewdu (m) /  Jane Kiptoo (f)
 April 22: Nova Poshta Kyiv Half Marathon in 
 Winners:  Lencho Tesfaye Anbesa (m) /  Viktoriya Kalyuzhna (f)
 May 6: Geneva Marathon in 
 Winners:  William Yegon (m) /  Amelework Fekadu (f)
 May 13: Dalian International Marathon in 
 Winners:  Edwin Kibet Koech (m) /  Mulu Seboka (f)
 May 20: Riga Marathon in 
 Winners:  Ayana Tsedat (m) /  Georgina Rono (f)
 June 16: Corrida de Langueux in 
 Winners:  Moses Kibet (m) /  Clémence Calvin (f)
 June 23: Vidovdan Road Race in 
 Winners:  Moses Kibet (m) /  Katsiaryna Shaban Karneyenka (f)
 September 9: Minsk Half Marathon in 
 Winners:  Abebe Degefa Negewo (m) /  Sheila Jerotich (f)
 September 23: Buenos Aires Marathon in 
 Winners:  Emmanuel Saina (m) /  Vivian Kiplagat Jerono (f)
 September 30: Warsaw Marathon in 
 Winners:  David Metto (m) /  Beatrice Cherop (f)
 October 14: Bucharest Marathon in 
 Winners:  Hosea Kipkemboi (m) /  Almaz Gelana (f)
 October 14: PKO Poznan Marathon in 
 Winners:  Cosmas Mutuku Kyeva (m) /  Tesfanesh Merga (f)
 October 28: Venice Marathon in 
 Winners:  Ayenew Gebre (m) /  Angela Tanui (f)
 November 4: French Riviera Marathon in 
 Winners:  Abrha Milaw (m) /  Nurit Yimam (f)
 November 4: Porto Marathon in 
 Winners:  Robert Chemonges (m) /  Abeba Tekulu Gebremeskel (f)
 November 11: Maratón Internacional Megacable Guadalajara in 
 Winners:  Silas Cheboit (m) /  Zewdnesh Ayele Belachew (f)
 November 11: Hefei International Marathon in 
 Winners:  Leonard Langat (m) /  Magdalene Masai (f)
 November 18: Kobe Marathon in 
 Winners:  Khalil Lemciyeh (m) /  Susan Jerotich (f)
 November 18: Boulogne-Billancourt Half Marathon in 
 Winners:  Taye Girma (m) /  Parendis Lekapana (f)
 November 25: Florence Marathon in 
 Winners:  Ali Abdi Gelelchu (m) /  Lonah Chemtai Salpeter (f)
 December 2: Marathon du Gabon Olam in 
 Winners:  Shedrack Kimayo (m) /  Joan Kigen (f)
 December 2: 10K Valencia Trinidad Alfonso in 
 Winners:  Jonas Leanderson (m) /  Susan Jeptoo (f)
 December 16: Bangsaen21 Half Marathon in 
 Winners:  Jamin Ekai Ngaukon (m) /  Chemtai Rionotukei (f)
 December 16: Mersin Marathon in 
 Winners:  Kenneth Kiplagat Limo (m) /  Konjit Tilahun (f)
 December 16: Tata Steel Kolkata 25K in 
 Winners:  Birhanu Legese (m) /  Dibaba Kuma (f)

EA Major Competitions
 February 4: 2018 European Champion Clubs Cup Cross Country in  Mira
 Men's winners:  Sporting CP (Davis Kiplangat, Pedro Silva, Rui Teixeira, Licinio Pimentel, Bruno Albuquerque) (m) 
 Women's winners:  Podlasie Białystok (Katarzyna Rutkowska, Paulina Mikiewicz-Łapińska, Paula Kopciewska, Izabela Parszczyńska) (f)
 February 10: 2018 Balkan U20 Indoor Championships in Athletics in  Sofia
 60 m winners:  Vesselin Jivkov (m) /  Marina Andreea Baboi (f)
 60 m hurdles winners:  Alexandru Ionuț Iconaru (m) /  Nika Glojnarič (f)
 400 m winners:  Sven Cepuš (m) /  Andrea Miklós (f)
 800 m winners:  Marino Bloudek (m) /  Diana Elena Bogos (f)
 1500 m winners:  Adrian Garcea (m) /  Silviya Georgieva (f)
 3000 m winners:  Elzan Bibić (m) /  Urkuş Işik (f)
 High Jump winners:  Jasmin Halili (m) /  Panagiota Dosi (f)
 Long Jump winners:  Panagiotis Mantzourogiannis (m) /  Klara Barnjak (f)
 Triple Jump winners:  Cristian Răzvan Grecu (m) /  Aleksandra Nacheva (f)
 Pole Vault winners:  Maxim Goldovsky (m) /  Nastja Modič (f)
 Shot Put winners:  Odysseas Mouzenidis (m) /  Maria Magkoulia (f)
 4x400 m winners:  (Ömer Karlidağ, Abdullah Özdemir, Ilyas Çanakçi, Mehmet Çelik) (m) /  (Adina Cârciogel, Iulia Banaga, Maria Scrob, Diana Elena Bogos) (f)
 February 17: 2018 Balkan Athletics Indoor Championships in  Istanbul
 March 10 & 11: 2018 European Throwing Cup  Leiria
 March 10 & 11: 2018 Balkan Masters Indoor Championships in  Belgrade
 March 18: 2018 Balkan Marathon Championships in  Limassol
 April 14: Balkan Race Walking Championships in  Pirot
 May 5: Balkan Mountain Running Championships in  Beočin
 May 26 – 27: European Champion Clubs Cup Track and Field Senior Group A in  Birmingham
 May 26 – 27: ECCC Track and Field Senior Group B in  Tampere
 June 3: 22nd 2018 European Cup 10,000m in  London
 June 9: Championships of the Small States of Europe in  Schaan
 June 9: Balkan U18 Championships in Athletics in  Istanbul
 June 9 & 10: 2018 Mediterranean Athletics U23 Championships in  Jesolo
 June 14 & 15: Balkan Relay Championships in  Erzurum
 June 23 & 24: Balkan U20 Championships in Athletics in  Bursa
 July 1: 17th 2018 European Mountain Running Championships in  Skopje
 July 5 – 8: 2nd 2018 European Athletics U18 Championships in  Győr
 July 20 & 21: 2018 Balkan Athletics Championships in  Stara Zagora
 September 15: ECCC Track and Field U20 in TBD place
 September 16: Balkan Half Marathon Championships in  Sarajevo
 November 4: Balkan Cross Country Championships in  Botoșani
 December 9: 25th 2018 European Cross Country Championships in  Tilburg

EA Cross Country Permit Races
 September 22 – 24, 2017: Lidingöloppet in  Lidingö
 Winners:  Napoleon Solomon (m) /  Maria Larsson (f)
 November 11, 2017: European Halloween Cross in  Middelfart
 Winners:  Napoleon Solomon (m) /  Sara Christiansson (f)
 November 11, 2017: Pforzheim-Huchenfeld Cross in  Pforzheim
 Winners:  Patrick Karl (m) /  Elena Burkard (f)
 November 18, 2017: Wyndham Grand CrossAttack in  Salzburg
 Winners:  Richard Ringer (m) /  Simona Vrzalová (f)
 November 19, 2017: XXIV Cross Internacional de Soria in  Soria
 Winners:  Jacob Kiplimo (m) /  Alice Aprot Nawowuna (f)
 November 19, 2017: Cross de l'Acier in  Leffrinckoucke
 Winners:  Birhanu Balew Yemataw (m) /  Margaret Chelimo Kipkemboi (f)
 November 25, 2017: 62nd Omer Besim Memorial in  Istanbul
 Winners:  Bernard Cheruiyot Sang (m) /  Meseret Yaye Asefa (f)
 November 26, 2017: Darmstadt Cross in  Darmstadt
 Winners:  Amanal Petros (m) /  Alina Reh (f)
 November 26, 2017: International Warandecross in  Tilburg
 Winners:  Napoleon Solomon (m) /  Meraf Bahta (f)
 November 26, 2017: Cross Internacional de la Constitución in  Alcobendas
 Winners:  Zakaria Maazouzi (m) /  Clara Viñarás (f)
 January 13: Great Edinburgh International Cross Country in  Edinburgh
 Winners:  Leonard Essau Korir (m) /  Yasemin Can (f)
 January 19 – 21: Abdycross in  Kerkrade
 Winners:  Chakib Lachgar (m) /  Sylvia Mboga Medugu (f)
 January 21: Lotto Cross Cup de Hannut in  Hannut
 Winners:  Soufiane Bouchikhi (m) /  Birtukan Adamu (f)
 January 21: Cross della Vallagarina in  Villa Lagarina
 Winners:  Telahun Haile Bekele (m) /  Norah Jeruto (f)
 February 25: Lotto Cross Cup (final) in  Brussels

EA Indoor Permit Meetings
 January 25: Czech Indoor Gala in  Ostrava
 60 m winners:  Yunier Perez (m) /  Ewa Swoboda (f)
 300 m winners:  Pavel Maslák (m) /  Anita Horvat (f)
 Men's 60 m Hurdles winner:  Petr Svoboda
 3000 m winners:  Mohammed Ayoub Tiouali (m) /  Hellen Obiri
 Long Jump winners:  Miltiádis Tentóglou (m) /  Háido Alexoúli (f)
 Pole Vault winners:  Emmanouil Karalis (m) /  Romana Maláčová (f)
 Women's High Jump winner:  Iryna Herashchenko
 Men's Shot Put winner:  Tomáš Staněk
 February 2 & 3: European Athletics Permit meeting Combined Events in  Tallinn
 Men's Heptathlon winner:  Kai Kazmirek
 Men's U20 Heptathlon winner:  Hendrik Lillemets
 Women's Pentathlon winner:  Alina Shukh
 February 3: Reykjavik International Games in  Reykjavik
 60 m winners:  Odain Rose (m) /  Diani Walker (f)
 400 m winners:  Marquis Caldwell (m) /  Arna Stefanía Gudmundsdóttir (f)
 800 m winners:  Sæmundur Ólafsson (m) /  Emily Jerotich (f)
 Women's High Jump winner:  Maja Nilsson
 Pole Vault winners:  Bjarki Gíslason (m) /  Hulda Thorsteinsdóttir (f)
 Long Jump winners:  Kristinn Torfason (m) /  Anne-Mari Lehtiö (f)
 Shot Put winners:  Scott Lincoln (m) /  Thelma Lind Kristjánsdóttir
 February 3: Meeting Elite en Salle de Mondeville in  Mondeville
 60 m winners:  Christophe Lemaitre (m) /  Remona Burchell (f)
 Women's 400 m winner:  Iveta Putalová
 Men's 1500 m winner:  Samuel Tefera
 Women's 2000 m winner:  Meskerem Mamo
 Men's 3000 m winner:  Jonathan Davies
 60 m Hurdles winners:  Jarret Eaton (m) /  Hanna Plotitsyna (f)
 Men's Triple Jump winner:  Nathan Douglas
 Women's Pole Vault winner:  Ninon Guillon-Romarin
 February 7: Meeting de Paris Indoor in  Paris
 60 m winners:  Arthur Gue Cissé (m) /  Marie-Josée Ta Lou (f)
 60 m Hurdles winners:  Jarret Eaton (m) /  Hanna Plotitsyna (f)
 Men's Long Jump winner:  Luvo Manyonga
 Women's Pole Vault winner:  Ekateríni Stefanídi
 Men's Triathlon winner:  Kevin Mayer
 February 9: Meeting Féminin du Val d'Oise in  Eaubonne
 Women's 60 m winner:  Marie-Josée Ta Lou
 Women's 200 m winner:  Anna Kiełbasińska
 Women's Triathlon winner:  Nafissatou Thiam
 Women's 800 m winner:  Habitam Alemu
 Women's 3000 m winner:  Melissa Courtney
 Women's 60 m Hurdles winner:  Nooralotta Neziri
 Women's High Jump winner:  Katarina Johnson-Thompson
 Women's Pole Vault winner:  Anzhelika Sidorova
 Women's Long Jump winner:  Lauma Grīva
 February 10: Gugl Indoor Meeting in  Linz
 60 m winners:  Zdenek Stromšík (m) /  Klára Seidlová (f)
 Women's 200 m winner:  Marcela Pírková
 Men's 400 m winner:  Yavuz Can
 Women's 800 m winner:  Irene Baldessari
 60 m Hurdles winners:  Silvio Henrique de Souza (m) /  Ivana Lončarek (f)
 Pole Vault winners:  Mareks Ārents (m) /  Amálie Švábíková (f)
 Women's Long Jump winner:  Ivona Dadic
 Men's Triple Jump winner:  Necati Er
 February 10: IFAM Indoor Meeting in  Ghent
 60 m winners:  Robin Vanderbemden (m) /  Jamile Samuel (f)
 400 m winners:  Tony van Diepen (m) /  Zoey Clark (f)
 800 m winners:  Maarten Plaum (m) /  Elena Bellò (f)
 1500 m winners:  Marcin Lewandowski (m) /  Alemaz Teshale (f)
 Men's 3000 m winner:  Regasa Chala
 60 m Hurdles winners:  Simone Poccia (m) /  Eefje Boons (f)
 High Jump winners:  Naoto Tobe (m) /  Sommer Lecky (f)
 Pole Vault winners:  Koen van der Wijst (m) /  Robin Wingbermühle (f)
 Long Jump winners:  Adam McMullen (m) /  Hanne Maudens (f)
 February 11: Meeting Elite en Salle de Metz in  Metz
 60 m winners:  Kimmari Roach (m) /  Marie Josée Ta Lou (f)
 Men's 200 m winner:  Christophe Lemaitre
 Women's 300 m winner:  Sarah Atcho
 800 m winners:  Clement Dhainaut (m) /  Nelly Jepkosgei (f)
 Men's 1500 m winner:  Taresa Tolosa
 Men's 3000 m winner:  Thierry Ndikumwenayo
 60 m Hurdles winners:  Roger Iribarne (m) /  Nooralotta Neziri (f)
 Men's Long Jump winner:  Luvo Manyonga
 Women's Triple Jump winner:  Paraskeví Papahrístou
 February 13: Meeting Arena Liévin in  Liévin
 60 m winners:  Andrew Fisher (m) /  Rosângela Santos (f)
 300 m winners:  Jonathan Borlée (m) /  Gunta Latiševa-Čudare (f)
 800 m winners:  Adam Kszczot (m) /  Habitam Alemu (f)
 Men's 1000 m winner:  Pierre-Ambroise Bosse
 1500 m winners:  Ayanleh Souleiman (m) /   Rababe Arafi (f)
 Men's 3000 m winner:  Selemon Barega
 60 m Hurdles winners:  Ludovic Payen (m) /  Hanna Plotitsyna (f)
 Pole Vault winners:  Xue Changrui (m) /  Ekateríni Stefanídi (f)
 Men's Triple Jump winner:  Almir dos Santos
 February 18: Istanbul Cup Indoor Athletics Meeting in  Istanbul
 60 m winners:  Emre Zafer Barnes (m) /  Hrystyna Stuy (f)
 400 m winners:  Amel Tuka (m) /  Anna Ryzhykova (f)
 Men's 1000 m winner:  Abraham Rotich
 Women's 1500 m winner:  Luiza Gega
 Men's 3000 m winner:  Amine Khadiri
 Women's 60 m Hurdles winner:  Hanna Plotitsyna
 Men's Long Jump winner:  Vladyslav Mazur
 Women's High Jump winner:  Kateryna Tabashnyk
 Women's Pole Vault winner:  Demet Parlak
 Women's Triple Jump winner:  Viktoriya Prokopenko
 Men's Shot Put winner:  Andrei Gag
 February 21: AIT International Grand Prix in  Anthlone
 February 21: Serbian Open Indoor Meeting in  Belgrad
 February 25: All Star Perche in  Clermont-Ferrand
TBD: Meeting Ville de Madrid in  Madrid

EA Outdoor Classic Meetings
 May 29: 16th European Athletics Festival Bydgoszcz in  Bydgoszcz
 June 2: Meeting of Andújar in  Andújar
 June 4: Memoriál Josefa Odložila in  Prague
 June 8: 12th Meeting Iberoamericano de Atletismo in  Huelva
 June 8: 63rd Janusz Kusociński Memorial in  Szczecin
 June 13: Meeting de Montreuil in 
 June 16: Meeting de Marseille Pro Athlé Tour in  Marseille

EA Outdoor Area Permit Meetings
 May 5 & 6: Georgian Open Championships in  Tbilisi
 May 13: Meeting Elite de Montgeron in  Montgeron
 May 19 & 20: Caucasian Cup in  Tbilisi
 May 27: Meeting Elite de Forbach in  Forbach

EA Combined Events Area Permit Meetings
 June 2 & 3: VII Meeting Internacional de Arona in  Arona

EA Outdoor Special Premium Meetings
 May 10: Athens Street Pole Vault (Special Premium) in  Athens

CAA Major Events
 March 17: 2018 African Cross Country Championships in  Chlef
 August 1 – 5: 2018 African Championships in Athletics in  Asaba

NACAC Major Events
 February 16 & 17: 2018 Central American Cross Country Championships in  San Salvador
 Seniors winners:  Alberto González Méndez (m) /  Jenny Méndez Suanca (f)
 U20 winners:  Joseph Alejandro Hernandez Silva (m) /  Noelia Vargas Mena (f)
 February 17: Pan American Cross Country Cup in  San Salvador
 Seniors winners:  Joseph Gray (m) /  Carmen Toaquiza (f)
 U20 winners:  Connor Lane (m) /  Brogan MacDougall (f)
 May 25 – 27: 2018 Central American Junior and Youth Championships in Athletics in  Panama City
 June 22 – 24: 2018 Central American Senior Championships in Athletics in  Managua
 June 28 – July 1: OECS Track and Field Championships in  Basseterre
 July 3 & 4: NACAC Combined Events Championships in  Ottawa
 August 10 – 12: 2018 NACAC Championships in  Toronto

CONSUDATLE
 March 16 & 17: South American Race Walking Championships in  Sucúa
 March 18: Ibero-American Marathon in

OAA
 January 20 – 27: Oceania Masters Athletics Championships in  Dunedin
 For all results, click here.
 February 11: Oceania Race Walking Championships in  Adelaide
 20 km Walk winners:  Perseus Karlström (m) /  Beki Smith (f)
 U20 10 km winners:  Declan Tingay (m) /  Katie Hayward (f)
 U18 5 km winners:  Joe Cross (m) /  Olivia Sandery (f)
 February 18: Oceania 10km Road Championships in  Hobart
 Winners:  Liam Adams (m) /  Lisa Jane Weightman (f)
 May 17 – 19: Melanesian Athletics Championships in  Port Vila
 100 m:  Heleina Young (f)
 200 m:  Nicole Kay (f)
 400 m:  Valentine Hello (f)
 800 m:  Isabella Thornton-Bott (f)
 1500 m:  Caitlin Murdock (f)
 3000 m:  Sharon Firisua (F)
 5000 m:  Audrey Hall (f)
 100 m Hurdles:  Rhonda Byrnes (f)
 400 m Hurdles:  Madeline Putz (f)
 4x100 m Relay:  A (Stephanie Welsh, Emma Klasen, Monique Quirk, Sophie White)
 High Jump:  Laura Perich (f)
 Pole Vault:  Isabelle Napier (f)
 Long Jump:  Allison Nankivell (f)
 Triple Jump:  Allison Nankivell (f)
 Shot Put:  Ashley Bologna (f)
 Discus Throw:  Larissa O'Dea (f)
 June 9 & 10: Oceania Combined Events Championships in 
 June 14 – 16: Micronesian Athletics Championships in  Saipan
 June 30 & July 1: Oceania Marathon and Half Marathon Championships 
 August 25: Oceania Cross Country Championships in TBD place
 September 6 – 8: Polynesian Regional Athletics Championships in  Apia

AAA
 February 1 – 3: 2018 Asian Indoor Athletics Championships in  Tehran
 60 m winners:  Hassan Taftian (m) /  Liang Xiaojing (f)
 400 m winners:  Abdalelah Haroun (m) /  Svetlana Golendova (f)
 800 m winners:  Abubaker Haydar Abdalla (m) /  Wang Chunyu (f)
 1500 m winners:  Amir Moradi (m) /  Gayanthika Artigala (f)
 3000 m winners:  Hossein Keyhani (m) /  Tatyana Neroznak (f)
 60 m Hurdles winners:  Abdulaziz Al-Mandeel (m) /  Aigerim Shynazbekova (f)
 4x400 m winners:  (m) /  (f)
 High jump winners:  Mutaz Essa Barshim (m) /  Nadiya Dusanova (f)
 Pole Vault winners:  Nikita Filippov (m) /  Anastasiya Yermakova (f)
 Long jump winners:  Shi Yuhao (m) /  Bùi Thị Thu Thảo (f)
 Triple jump winners:  Khaled Al-Subaie (m) /  Irina Ektova (f)
 Shot put winners:  Ali Samari (m) /  Elena Smolyanova (f)
 Men's Heptathlon winner:  Majed Radhi Al-Sayed
 Women's Pentathlon winner:  Sepideh Tavakoli

Deaths

References

Notes

External links

 IAAF official website

 
Athletics
2018
2018 sport-related lists